The 1894–95 season was the twelfth to be played by the team now known as Bristol Rovers, and their eleventh playing under the name Eastville Rovers. The first team played its third season in the first division of the Bristol & District League (now known as the Western Football League), while the reserves competed in the second division of the same competition for the second time. The season was notable for having the first modern Bristol derby when Bristol South End, who later became Bristol City, hosted Eastville Rovers on 22 September.

Season review
The 1894–95 season began with the announcements that H. McBain would replace F.A. Yates as club captain, and that the team would move to a new ground on the opposite side of Ridgeway Road from their home the previous season in Ridgeway. Following a lacklustre campaign the previous season, where both the first team and the reserves finished just one place off the bottom of their divisions, the 1894–94 campaign was one of consolidation. The first team would eventually end the year in a mid-table position, while the reserves finished in 7th place out of 11.

A large growth in the number of spectators watching their games was noted by the Bristol Mercury in October, with crowds of several hundred regularly watching the first team this season. In previous years their attendances had been as low as a few dozen.

League tables

Bristol & District League Division One

Bristol & District League Division Two

Match results

Bristol & District League

Division One

Division Two

Note: Three results were given against Warmley Reserves in the press over the course of the season. It's possible that one of these was a friendly match, or that the result of one of these ties was overturned and the game re-played.

Gloucestershire Senior Challenge Cup
After receiving a bye in the first round thanks to them reaching the final the previous season, Eastville Rovers were eliminated from the cup at the quarter-final stage. They were drawn to play Mangotsfield at home in a game that was played in a snowstorm and Mangotsfield prevailed 5–3. This was in spite of the fact Mangotsfield were reduced to ten men during the first half when their captain, Brain, suffered a broken collarbone.

Friendlies

First team

Notes

Statistics
Friendly matches are not included in this section.

Cumulative record
The total cumulative record of Eastville Rovers up to the end of the 1894–95 season is shown below. This is calculated by adding the numbers in the section above to the total games played up to the end of the previous season. Friendly matches are not included in this table, and games held at neutral venues are considered to have been played away from home.

References

Bristol Rovers F.C. seasons
Eastville Rovers